Daniel Rowe may refer to:

Daniel Rowe (cricketer) (born 1984), Welsh-born English cricketer
Danny Rowe (footballer, born 1989), English footballer for Chesterfield FC
Danny Rowe (footballer, born 1992), English footballer
Daniel Rowe (footballer, born 1995), English footballer